Andi is a large village in the Botlikh region in Dagestan, Russia

Geographical location 
Located 14 km north-east of the village Botlikh.

Population 
The villagers are Andis (censuses may be marked as Avars). Before the deportation, a large number of Chechens lived there, including the Kharchievs, Sultanovs, Izrailovs, Makhmudovs, Mamaevs, Musalaevs, Apraev-Mamedov, Valiev, Gelegaev, Guchigov, Abdukerimov, Gelichaev, Mamedkhanov.

Language 
The villagers speak the Andi language. In 1981, a linguistic expedition  of the Faculty of Philology, Moscow State University was led by A. E. Kibrika.

Famous natives 
  — Soviet and Russian archaeologist, a specialist in the Paleolithic of the Caucasus and the Middle East.
  — fighter of the self-defense detachment of his native village, Hero of the Russian Federation (1999, posthumous).
  – deputy of the State Duma of the Federal Assembly of the Russian Federation of the VI convocation.

Notes

Sources
 

Rural localities in Botlikhsky District